Vyacheslav Konstantinovich von Plehve (– ) served as a director of Imperial Russia's police from 1881 to 1884 and later as  Minister of the Interior (in office: 1902–1904) prior to his assassination.

Biography 
Plehve was born in Meshchovsk, Kaluga Governorate, Russia, on 20 April 1846. He was the only son of schoolteacher Konstantin von Plehve and Elizaveta Mikhailovna Shamaev, daughter of a minor landowner. In 1851, Plehve's family moved from Meshchovsk to Warsaw, where his father accepted a job as an instructor in a gymnasium.

After studying law at the Moscow University, he joined the ministry of justice in 1867. He served as assistant prosecutor in the Vladimir circuit court and as a prosecutor in Vologda. In 1876 he was appointed assistant prosecutor of the Warsaw Chamber of Justice, and in 1879 as prosecutor of the Saint Petersburg Chamber of Justice.

In 1881 he investigated the murder of Alexander II and then joined the Interior Ministry as a Director of the Department of Police, also in charge of the Secret Police. He is credited with the destruction of numerous "People's Will" terrorist groups.

He became a member of the Governing Senate in 1884 and assistant minister of Interior in 1885. As an assistant minister, at first under Count Dmitry Tolstoy and later under his successor, Ivan Durnovo, Plehve had shown definite administrative talent.

Made an Actual Privy Counsellor in 1899, he was Finnish Minister Secretary of State from that year until 1904. He supported the abolition of the separate Finnish army in 1901.

In April 1902, following the assassination of Dmitry Sipyagin, he was appointed minister of interior and chief of Gendarmes. After a brief attempt at conciliation with the zemstvo conservatives failed, he relapsed—disbanding the police-supported labour unions (zubatovshchina).

In 1902, Plehve used his position as minister of interior to insist that Hirsh Lekert, who had tried to assassinate the governor of Vilnius, Victor von Wahl, be tried under wartime law. This virtually guaranteed a death sentence.

In August 1903 he met with Theodor Herzl in Saint Petersburg, discussing the establishment of Zionist societies in Russia, and proposed a Russian government request to the Turks to obtain a charter for Jewish colonisation of Palestine.

Plehve became a target for Jewish revolutionaries after his meeting with Theodor Herzl although he had forwarded Herzl's proposals to the czar.

After he did nothing to prevent a bloody wave of anti-Jewish violence in 1903, the known double agent Yevno Azef decided not to inform on the Socialist Revolutionary Party plans to kill Plehve. He survived one attack in 1903 and two in 1904 before the Socialist-Revolutionary Combat Organization succeeded. On 28 July 1904, a bomb was thrown into Plehve's horse-drawn carriage by a member of the Socialist Revolutionary Party named Igor Sazonov, on his weekly audience with the Tsar at Izmailovsky Prospekt in Saint Petersburg, killing him.

Political legacy
Because Plehve carried out the russification of the provinces within the Russian Empire, he earned bitter hatred in Poland, in Lithuania and especially in Finland. He despoiled the Armenian Apostolic Church, and was credited with being accessory to the Kishinev pogroms. His logical mind and determined support of the autocratic principle gained the tsar's entire confidence. He opposed commercial development on ordinary European lines on the ground that it involved the existence both of a dangerous proletariat and of a prosperous middle class equally inimical to autocracy.

Notes

References

Further reading

External links

1846 births
1904 deaths
People from Meshchovsk
People from Meshchovsky Uyezd
Russian people of German descent
Russian nobility
Active Privy Councillor (Russian Empire)
Members of the Russian Assembly
Interior ministers of Russia
Members of the State Council (Russian Empire)
Senators of the Russian Empire
Russian police chiefs
Moscow State University alumni
Assassinated politicians of the Russian Empire
Recipients of the Order of the White Eagle (Russia)
Recipients of the Order of St. Vladimir, 2nd class
Recipients of the Order of St. Anna, 1st class
Recipients of the Order of Saint Stanislaus (Russian), 1st class